Settlers: The Mythology of the White Proletariat is a 1983 book credited to J. Sakai that looks at the history of the United States of America (referred to as Amerika throughout the book) from an anti-imperialist and non-white perspective. The book was influenced by Maoist thought, and has in turn influenced Third-Worldists, in particular Maoist–Third Worldists.

Summary
Settlers argues that the class system in the United States is built upon the genocide of Native Americans and the enslavement of Africans and that the white working class in the United States constitutes a privileged labor aristocracy that lacks proletarian consciousness. Arguing that the white working class possesses a petit-bourgeois and reformist consciousness, the book posits that the colonized peoples of the United States constitutes the proletariat.

Reception 
Several leftist groups are critical of the book. The Monthly Review describes the book as "preposterous on its face" and "an insult to those whites who have suffered the grossest exploitation and still do." The Communist Party USA says the book "reveals the author’s bias against working-class unity and plays into the hands of the ruling class".

In his book Continuity and Rupture, J. Moufawad-Paul cited Settlers as a "subterranean movement text" that is an example of a revival of Maoist thought in the late 20th century at a time that Marxism-Leninism was waning.

Settlers has influenced the political thought of David Gilbert, a Weather Underground militant, and included commentary on the work in the 2017 reissue of Gilbert's Looking at the White Working Class Historically.

Publication history
Settlers was originally published under the title Mythology of the White Proletariat: A Short Course in Understanding Babylon. The fourth edition was issued in 2014 by Kersplebedeb Publishing under the title Settlers: The Mythology of the White Proletariat from Mayflower to Modern.

See also
 Marxism–Leninism–Maoism
 Maoism–Third Worldism

References

External links
 

1983 non-fiction books
Anti-imperialism in North America
Anti-racism in the United States
History books about colonialism
English-language books
Majority–minority relations
Maoist works
Marxist books
Working class in the United States
Works about racism
Works about White Americans